Karakol (قاراقول,), formerly Przhevalsk, is the fourth-largest city in Kyrgyzstan, near the eastern tip of Lake Issyk-Kul, about  from the Kyrgyzstan–China border and  from the capital Bishkek. It is the administrative capital of Issyk-Kul Region. To the north, on highway A363, is Tüp, and to the southwest Jeti-Ögüz resort.

History
A Russian military outpost founded on 1 July 1869, Karakol grew in the 19th century after explorers came to map the peaks and valleys separating Kyrgyzstan from China.  In the 1880s Karakol's population surged with an influx of Dungans, Chinese Muslims fleeing warfare in China.

In 1888, the Russian explorer Nicholay Przhevalsky died in Karakol of typhoid, while preparing for an expedition to Tibet; the city was renamed Przhevalsk in his honor. After local protests, the town was given its original name back in 1921—a decision reversed in 1939 by Stalin to celebrate the centenary of the explorer's birth. Karakol then remained Przhevalsk until the demise of the Soviet Union in 1991. However the name has been retained by nearby Pristan'-Przheval'sk.

Nearby Issyk Kul Lake was used by the Soviet military as a testing site for torpedo propulsion and guidance systems and Karakol was thus home to a sizable population of military personnel and their families. Karakol continues to be a major hub for visitors of Issyk Kul Lake.

Demographics
Karakol is the fourth largest city in Kyrgyzstan after Bishkek, Osh and Jalal-Abad. The resident population of Karakol, as of 2021, was 84,351, of which 2,829 in Pristan'-Przheval'sk. The largest ethnic minority groups in Karakol are Russians (17.0%, 2009 census) and Uyghurs (3.9%).

Geography

Climate
Karakol features a humid continental climate (Dfb) according to the Köppen climate classification.

Sights

Karakol is one of Kyrgyzstan's major tourist destinations, serving as a starting point for the hiking, trekking, skiing and mountaineering in the high central Tian Shan to the south and east. Also this city is culturally rich, with several different ethnic groups that live here such as Dungan, Uyghur, Kalmak, Uzbek, Russians and of course Kyrgyz.

Facilities themselves are still a closed, military area.

Karakol has Central Asia's highest ski resort, with 20km of slopes, situated about 20 minutes from the town. Unlike Shymbulak resort, the riding at Karakol includes forest areas as well as cleared trails.

Russian Orthodox cathedral 

The cathedral was originally built of stone in 1872, when Karakol was a garrison town established as an outpost on the edges of the Tsarist Russian Empire. It was destroyed in 1890 by an earthquake and the current cathedral was built out of wood on a brick base. It took six years to complete, and was finally completed in 1895.  During the period of construction, a yurt served the congregation as a church. It has seen considerable service, not just as a church. During an anti-Russian uprising in 1916 its monks were brutally murdered.

Over the years, particularly following the Revolution in 1917, it has been used as an educational center housing a school, ladies' gymnasium and an institution of Higher Education; a Sports Hall; a Theater; a Dance Hall and even as a Coal Store. Then, in 1991, following the collapse of the Soviet Union and the Independence of Kyrgyzstan, the local authority once again gave the building back to the church, with the proviso that all further restorations were their responsibility.

Dungan mosque 

The Issyk-kul Central Mosque of Karakol city was built for the local Dungan community by an initiative of Ibrahim Aji. He invited the famous Beijing architect Chou Seu and 20 carvers with the skills of traditional Chinese architecture and composition techniques for building the mosque. The construction of outbuildings and other work involved local craftsmen. Construction of the mosque began in 1904 and was completed in 1910. Ingenious techniques allowed the builders to build the mosque with no nails. The mosque holds 42 based pillars and encircling the building is multi-tiered wooden cornice, decorated with images of plants like grapes, pomegranates, pears and peaches. From 1929 to 1947 (during the Soviet era) the mosque was used as a storehouse. In 1947, the building was given to the Muslim community and continues to function as a mosque. It is registered as a historical monument and protected by law. Today the mosque is open to visitors.

Przhevalsky Museum 

Nikolay Przhevalsky was one of the first Russian Scientist-Geographer to start detailed studies of the geography, flora and fauna of the Central Asian countries. Beginning from 1870, he arranged four large expeditions to Mongolia, China and Tibet. During his expeditions he revealed the exact directions of the mountain ranges and borders of the Tibet Mountains. He described the nature, relief, climate, flora and fauna in the territories under his study and discovered over 200 plant species. Przhevalsky also collected an enormous zoological collection which comprised several thousand species of plants, animals, birds, fishes and insects. In the year of 1888, he died from typhoid fever on the eve of his fifth expedition to Central Asia; he was buried on the Issyk-Kul lakeside not far from the city of Karakol. The Memorial Museum of N. M. Przhevalsky was opened on 29 April 1957 in Karakol.

Karakol Historical Museum 
This small museum was the pre-revolutionary summer home of the Iliana merchant family. During the turbulent years of 1918–20 the building earned its socialist stripes as headquarters of the Regional Revolutionary Committee, and was subsequently transformed into a museum by order of the Soviet Council of Ministers in 1948. Scythian artifacts include enormous bronze pots retrieved from Lake Issyk-Kul, displayed alongside exhibits on petroglyphs in the area. Besides a comprehensive display of traditional Kyrgyz punched leather work, felt wall hangings and woven yurt decorations, the museum has a colorful collection of national costumes, examples of finely worked silver jewellery and a good exhibition of Kyrgyz applied art. One hall covers the region's flora and fauna – much of which is endangered and listed in the 'Red Book' (a Soviet inventory of protected species). The museum is also worth visiting to gain a Soviet perspective of history in the region. A couple of walls relating to Kyrgyz union with Russia and the subsequent revolution are now historical artifacts in themselves.

Bugu-Ene Zoo 
Karakol Zoological Park was founded in 1987. This is the only zoo in Kyrgyzstan. After the demise of the Soviet Union, the economics of the country collapsed. In 2001, closing the zoo was considered. However, sponsors were found, which allowed the captive animals to be preserved. There are Japanese macaques, bears, wolf, deer, camels, lamas, Przewalski's horse, peacock, lions and many others.

Animal Market 

Early on Sunday mornings one of Kyrgyzstan's biggest animal markets takes place around 2km north of central Karakol. Locals loading and unloading sheep into the back of a sedan is not an uncommon sight. The setting amid semi-derelict flour mills might seem unprepossessing, but on clear days the backdrop of white-topped mountains is more striking from here than from the town center. A series of earthen unloading platforms lead north. Jostle through the chaos to reach a bigger main compound one block north, where horses and embossed leather saddlery are for sale. On foot the bazaar is about 25 minutes' walk from City Center.

Hiking and Camping 
Karakol is quite popular among fans of mountain hiking, overnight stays in tents.  Here begins the beautiful hiking trails: Karakol Peak, Alakul Lake, Altyn Arashan and Sary Zhaz Valley. Routes are very contrasting, ranging from green forests to glaciers. Good time for hiking is from June to September.

Notable inhabitants
 Grigoriy Shemyakin, born in 1906, Hero of the Soviet Union, one of Panfilov's Twenty-Eight Guardsmen
Tugelbay Sydykbekov (1912–1997), writer

Sister cities
 Asheville, North Carolina, United States
 Gebze, Kocaeli, Turkey

References

External links

 

Populated places in Issyk-Kul Region
Semirechye Oblast
Populated places along the Silk Road
Horse trade
Ski areas and resorts in Kyrgyzstan